is a railway station in the city of Inuyama, Aichi Prefecture,  Japan, operated by Meitetsu.

Lines

Station layout
The station has two opposed side platforms connected by a level crossing. The station has automated ticket machines, Manaca automated turnstiles and is unattended..

Platforms

}

Adjacent stations

|-
!colspan=5|Nagoya Railroad

Station history
Inuyamaguchi Station was opened on August 6, 1912.

Passenger statistics
In fiscal 2015, the station was used by an average of 1593 passengers daily.

Surrounding area
Inuyama Minami Elementary School

See also
 List of Railway Stations in Japan

References

External links

 Official web page 

Railway stations in Japan opened in 1912
Railway stations in Aichi Prefecture
Stations of Nagoya Railroad
Inuyama, Aichi